Bo or BO may refer to

Arts and entertainment

Film, television, and theatre
Box office, where tickets to an event are sold, and by extension, the amount of business a production receives
BA:BO, 2008 South Korean film 
Bo (film), a Belgian film starring Ella-June Henrard and directed by Hans Herbots

Gaming
Call of Duty: Black Ops, a first-person shooter video game
Blood Omen: Legacy of Kain, first in the Legacy of Kain video game series

Music
Bo (instrument), a Chinese cymbal
Bo, a Greek rapper.

Religion
Bo or Bodhi Tree
Bo (parsha), fifteenth weekly Torah reading

Ethnic groups
Bo people (China), a nearly extinct minority population in Southern China
Bo people of Laos, see List of ethnic groups in Laos
Bo people (Andaman), a recently extinct group in the Andaman Islands

Human names
Bo (given name), name origin, plus a list of people and fictional characters with the name or nickname
Bo (surname), name origin, plus a list of people with the surname
Bo (Chinese surname), Chinese family names
Bő (genus), Hungarian medieval noble clan
Bø (disambiguation), which includes several people with the surname
Htun Aeindra Bo, Burmese actress and singer born Mi Mi Khine in 1966
Lisa del Bo, Belgian singer born Reinhilde Goossens in 1961
Bo Dupp, a ring name, along with Otto Schwanz, of American professional wrestler William Happer (born 1972)
Björgvin Halldórsson, Icelandic singer also known as "Bo"

Science

Biology and medicine 
 Bacterial overgrowth, a medical disorder of malabsorption
 Bowel obstruction
Body odor or B.O.
 Bronchiolitis obliterans
 BO strain of the Caenorhabditis elegans var. Bergerac model worm
 Ficus religiosa, a.k.a. Bo-Tree, a species of Asian fig

Mathematics, chemistry and physics 
 BO, in mathematics, the classifying space of the orthogonal group
 In chemistry and physics, the Born–Oppenheimer approximation

Places
Bő, Hungary, a village
Bø (disambiguation), various places in Norway
Bo, Chanthaburi, Thailand
Bo, Hòa Bình, Vietnam
Bo, Sierra Leone, a city
Bo, Yaba, Burkina Faso
Le Bô, a commune in the Calvados departement, France
Palazzo Bo, or "Il Bo", the historic seat of the University of Padua in Italy
Bo (Bó), the original capital of the Tang King who founded China's Shang Dynasty, and its accurate location is still disputed. Two strong candidates are Yanshi Shang City and Zhengzhou Shang City.

Transportation
Baltimore and Ohio Railroad (reporting mark BO)
Bouraq Indonesia Airlines (IATA airline code BO)
BO, UIC classification for the railroad locomotive wheel arrangement 0-4-0, in the Whyte notation

Other uses
 Bó (bank), a banking brand in the United Kingdom
 Bō, or east Asian quarterstaff, a staff weapon used in the martial art Bōjutsu
 Bō, a Japanese honorific suffix
 Bo (dog) (2008–2021), a pet belonging to U.S. President Barack Obama
 Bo (title), a Chinese title typically translated as "count"
 Bo Bedre, Danish lifestyle and interior design
 Bojagi or bo, a Korean wrapping cloth
 Bojangles (disambiguation)
 Bo School, a secondary school in Bo, Sierra Leone
 Back Orifice, remote administration software
 Barrel of Oil, sometimes used in place of bbl
 Beneficial owner, in property law
 Biarritz Olympique, a French rugby union club
 Business Objects (company), an enterprise software company
 Bolivia (ISO 3166-1 country code)
 .bo, Internet country code top-level domain (ccTLD) for Bolivia
 Bo language (disambiguation)
"bo", Standard Tibetan ISO 639-1 language code

See also
Pages that begin with "Bo"
Pages that include "Bo"
B0 (disambiguation)
BOH (disambiguation)
Beau (disambiguation)
Bow (disambiguation)

Language and nationality disambiguation pages